The 2010 season is the 100th season of competitive football in Paraguay.

Primera División

Transfers

 List of transfers during the 2010 season registered under the Asociación Paraguaya de Fútbol.

National team

Men's national team

Women's national team

References

 Paraguay: Fixtures and Results

External links
 Paraguay 2010 by Eli Schmerler and Juan Pablo Andrés at RSSSF
 Diario ABC Color

 
Seasons in Paraguayan football